The Karakhan Manifesto was a statement of Soviet policy toward China dated 25 July 1919. It was issued by Lev Karakhan, deputy commissioner for foreign affairs for Soviet Russia. The manifesto offered to relinquish various rights Russia had obtained by treaty in China, including extraterritoriality, economic concessions, and Russia's share of the Boxer indemnity. These and similar treaties had been denounced by Chinese nationalists as "unequal." The manifesto created a favorable impression of Russia and Marxism among Chinese. It was often contrasted with the Treaty of Versailles (1919), which granted Shandong to Japan.

The manifesto was prompted by the Bolshevik advance into Siberia, which created a need to establish a relationship with China. The Bolsheviks saw the Chinese as one of "the oppressed peoples of the East" and therefore a potential ally against the imperialist powers.

The manifesto is addressed to, "the Chinese people and the Governments of North and South China." Because both Russia and China were in a state of civil war at this time, diplomatic exchanges were often delayed. Although the document was published in Moscow in August 1919, it was not formally presented to Chinese diplomats until February 1920. The version presented at this time includes the passage, "the Soviet Government returns to the Chinese people, without any compensation, the Chinese Eastern Railway."

Six months later, Karakhan personally handed the Chinese a second version of the manifesto, one that did not include this remarkable offer. In fact, the Soviet authorities denied ever having made it. The railway offer had been included by "mistake," they explained. The Soviets may have hoped the offer of the railway would generate an enthusiastic response in Beijing, leading to a Sino-Soviet alliance against Japan. The warlords in Beijing, closely tied to Japan, responded hesitantly. When the hoped-for alliance proved unattainable, the Russians withdrew their offer. In any event, traditional Russian interests and rights in China, including control of the Chinese Eastern Railway, were reaffirmed in a series of secret agreements made in 1924–1925.

The manifesto came at a crucial time in the development of Chinese communism. It encouraged interest in Marxism and thus played a role in the founding of the Chinese Communist Party in 1921.

References

China–Soviet Union relations
1919 in China
1919 in international relations
1919 in Russia
1919 documents